is the 22nd single of Japanese duo Pink Lady and last official single before their disbandment. The single was released on March 5, 1981. it was written by Shunichi Tokura and Yū Aku, who were behind the duo's most successful hits during the 1970s.

The song sold 200,000 copies. On March 29, 1981, the duo performed the song on the 500th episode of Star Tanjō!, five years after they made their debut in the talent show.

A re-recorded version of the song was included on the 2-disc greatest hits release, INNOVATION, released in December 2010.

Track listing 
All lyrics are written by Yū Aku; all music is composed and arranged by Shunichi Tokura.

Chart positions

Cover versions
 The tribute group Pink Babies covered the song in their "UFO" Type-B single in 2017. Their version of "Muchū ga Ichiban Utsukushī" is included in the Type-A release of the single.

References

External links
 
 

1981 singles
1981 songs
Pink Lady (band) songs
Japanese-language songs
Songs with lyrics by Yū Aku
Songs with music by Shunichi Tokura
Victor Entertainment singles